Endiandra is a genus of about 126 species of plants, mainly trees, in the laurel family Lauraceae.  They are commonly called "walnut" despite not being related to the Northern Hemisphere walnuts (Juglans spp.) which are in the family Juglandaceae.

Ecology
Shrubs and trees with lauroid leaves mostly, with bisexual flowers, usually with a large edible berry ovoid or globose, and seated directly on the pedicel. The seeds are dispersed by animals and birds.  They have a broad distribution across South East Asia, Australia and into the western Pacific Ocean.

Endiandra is a genus of evergreen trees belonging to the Laurel family, Lauraceae.
Fossils show that before glaciations, when the climate was more humid and mild, species were distributed more widely. They are distributed in Asia, from India to Indochina, China, Malaysia, Australia, and Pacific islands, with 38 species endemic to Australia.

In Australia, they are often used as screen trees due to the thick foliage of a number of their species. Quite a few of the Australian species are rare, such as Endiandra globosa, Endiandra muelleri subsp. bracteata and Endiandra floydii.

The drying of the area during the glaciations caused that Endiandra to retreat to the mildest climate refuges, including Oceanic and southern islands and wetter mountain area. With the end of the last glacial period, Endiandra recovered some of its former range. They are mostly relicts of a type of vegetation disappeared, which originally covered much of the mainland of Australia, South America, Antarctica, South Africa, North America and other lands when their climate were more humid and warm. Although warm Cloud forests disappeared during the glaciations, they re-colonized large areas every time the weather was favorable again. Most of the Cloud forests are believed to have retreated and advanced during successive geological eras, and their species adapted to warm and wet gradually retreated and advanced, replaced by more cold-tolerant or drought-tolerant sclerophyll plant communities. Many of the then existing species became extinct because they could not cross the barriers posed by new oceans, mountains and deserts, but others found refuge as species relict in coastal areas and Islands.

Some species are well adapted to Tropical dry or deciduous forests, including Monsoon forests and Dry Monsoon forest.
Some Endiandra present a convergent evolution due to ecological or physical drivers toward a similar solution, including analogous structures with species adapted to different environments, for example with plants adapted to Laurel forest habitat. These Endiandra resemble other genera in the family Lauraceae, and their leaves are lauroid type with berries eaten and dispersed mostly by birds. Others are even adapted to very wet media.

Some species are endangered and others have a very specialized ecological niche and consequently occupy small or specific areas. Although the majority of the species are the products of parapatric speciation, some groups have an ancient Gondwanan distribution and some groups responded to favourable climatic periods as opportunistic species and expanded across the available habitat, these last groups occur across wide distribution with close relatives and few species, indicating the recent divergence of these species.

Many species are having edible fruits. Some birds and bats that are specialised frugivores tend to eat the whole fruit and regurgitate seeds intact, which functions for Biological dispersal. Others swallow the fruit and pass the seed intact through the gut. An incomplete list of birds that rely heavily on the fruit for their diet include members of the families Cotingidae, Columbidae, Trogonidae, Turdidae, and Toucan. The fruits are an important food source for Palaeognathae highly dependent. Seed dispersal of various species in the genus is also carried out by fishes and big and small mammals as Pachyderms, Bovids, monkeys, arboreal rodents, porcupines, or possums.

Species
There were 126 accepted species as of May 2021.  
These are:

Endiandra acuminata 
Endiandra aggregata 
Endiandra albiramea 
Endiandra aneityensis 
Endiandra anthropophagorum 
Endiandra archboldiana 
Endiandra areolata 
Endiandra arfakensis 
Endiandra asymmerrica 
Endiandra baillonii 
Endiandra beccariana 
Endiandra bellendenkerana 
Endiandra bessaphila 
Endiandra brassii 
Endiandra bullata 
Endiandra carrii 
Endiandra chartacea 
Endiandra clavigera 
Endiandra clemensii 
Endiandra collinsii 
Endiandra compressa  – New South Wales & Queensland, Australia
Endiandra cooperana 
Endiandra coriacea 
Endiandra cowleyana 
Endiandra crassiflora 
Endiandra cuneata 
Endiandra cyphellophora 
Endiandra dichrophylla 
Endiandra dielsiana 
Endiandra discolor  – New South Wales & Queensland, Australia
Endiandra djamuensis 
Endiandra dolichocarpa 
Endiandra elaeocarpa 
Endiandra elongata 
Endiandra engleriana 
Endiandra euadenia 
Endiandra eusideroxylocarpa 
Endiandra faceta 
Endiandra ferruginea 
Endiandra firma 
Endiandra flavinervis 
Endiandra floydii  – New South Wales & Queensland, Australia
Endiandra forbesii 
Endiandra formicaria 
Endiandra fulva 
Endiandra gem 
Endiandra gemopsis 
Endiandra gillespiei 
Endiandra glauca 
Endiandra globosa  – New South Wales & Queensland, Australia
Endiandra grandifolia 
Endiandra grayi 
Endiandra hainanensis 
Endiandra havelii 
Endiandra hayesii  – New South Wales & Queensland, Australia
Endiandra holttumii 
Endiandra hypotephra  – Queensland, Australia
Endiandra immersa 
Endiandra impressicosta 
Endiandra insignis 
Endiandra introrsa  – New South Wales & Queensland, Australia
Endiandra invasiorum 
Endiandra javanica 
Endiandra jonesii 
Endiandra kingiana 
Endiandra lanata 
Endiandra latifolia 
Endiandra laxiflora 
Endiandra lecardii 
Endiandra ledermannii 
Endiandra leptodendron 
Endiandra limnophila 
Endiandra longipedicellata 
Endiandra luteola 
Endiandra macrophylla 
Endiandra macrostemon 
Endiandra magnilimba 
Endiandra maingayi 
Endiandra merrillii 
Endiandra microneura 
Endiandra microphylla 
Endiandra minutiflora 
Endiandra × monothyra 
Endiandra montana 
Endiandra monticola 
Endiandra muelleri  – New South Wales & Queensland, Australia
Endiandra multiflora 
Endiandra neocaledonica 
Endiandra oblonga 
Endiandra ochracea 
Endiandra oviformis 
Endiandra palmerstonii 
Endiandra papuana 
Endiandra phaeocarpa 
Endiandra pilosa 
Endiandra polyneura 
Endiandra poueboensis 
Endiandra praeclara 
Endiandra pubens  – New South Wales & Queensland, Australia
Endiandra recurva 
Endiandra reticulata 
Endiandra rhizophoretum 
Endiandra rigidior 
Endiandra rubescens 
Endiandra sankeyana 
Endiandra schlechteri 
Endiandra scrobiculata 
Endiandra sebertii 
Endiandra sericea 
Endiandra sideroxylon 
Endiandra sieberi  – New South Wales & Queensland, Australia
Endiandra sleumeri 
Endiandra solomonensis 
Endiandra spathulata 
Endiandra sphaerica 
Endiandra sulavesiana 
Endiandra teschneri 
Endiandra teschneriana 
Endiandra trichotosa 
Endiandra tryphera 
Endiandra versteeghii 
Endiandra virens  – New South Wales & Queensland, Australia
Endiandra whitmorei 
Endiandra wolfei 
Endiandra wongawallanensis 
Endiandra wrayi 
Endiandra xanthocarpa 
Endiandra xylophylla

References

 
Lauraceae genera
Flora of New South Wales
Flora of Queensland
Laurales of Australia